Ázqueta is a town in Navarre, Spain. It is located in the municipality of Igúzquiza.  Ázqueta is located on the French Way path of the Camino de Santiago.

References 

Municipalities in Navarre